Hister abbreviatus is a species of clown beetle in the family Histeridae. It is found in Central America and North America.

References

Further reading

 
 

Histeridae
Articles created by Qbugbot
Beetles described in 1775
Taxa named by Johan Christian Fabricius